The Woods–Gerry House (or Dr. Marshall Woods House) is an historic house on 62 Prospect Street in Providence, Rhode Island. It is a large, three story brick structure, designed by Richard Upjohn and built in 1860 for Dr. and Mrs. Marshall Wood. It features restrained Italianate styling, most evident in its porch and porte-cochere, and in its roofline. The building currently houses the Admissions office for the Rhode Island School of Design.

The house was listed on the National Register of Historic Places in 1971.

Gallery

See also
National Register of Historic Places listings in Providence, Rhode Island

References

External links

Houses completed in 1860
Houses on the National Register of Historic Places in Rhode Island
Houses in Providence, Rhode Island
Historic American Buildings Survey in Rhode Island
Rhode Island School of Design
National Register of Historic Places in Providence, Rhode Island
Historic district contributing properties in Rhode Island